Sahlian Maldialan is a village in Bagh District, Azad Kashmir, Pakistan. It is named Sahlian Maldialan after a person named Sahli Khan. The total population of Sahlian Maldialan is almost 10,000. 

The village is surrounded by Nala Mahl, Dharray, Naryola and Singola (Poonch) Azad Kashmir. Dharray is situated at its northeastern side, and Naryola lies at its western side. Singola, Poonch AJK is located to the south. The village is also one of the border lines between District Bagh and District Poonch. The highest place of this village is Bilaar potha whereas Mang bazar is the lowest place which is situated near Nala Mahl.

There are three high schools, Government Boys High School Sahlian Maldialan, Government Girls High School Sahlain Maldialan and Read Foundation High School Kotera Sahlian, and three middle schools, GBMS Kotera Sahlian, GGMS Kotera Sahlian and Read Foundation School Sahlian Maldialan along with five primary schools. Central Sahlian Maldialan is 10 kilometers away from Bagh.

References 

Populated places in Bagh District